Each "article" in this category is a collection of entries about several stamp issuers, presented in alphabetical order. The entries are formulated on the micro model and so provide summary information about all known issuers.  

See the :Category:Compendium of postage stamp issuers page for details of the project.

Kalimnos 

Dates 	1912–1932
Capital 	Kalimnos
Currency  	100 centesimi = 1 lira

Refer 	Aegean Islands (Dodecanese)

Kamerun 

Dates 	1897–1915
Capital 	Yaoundé
Currency 	100 pfennige = 1 mark

Refer 	German Colonies

Kampuchea 

Dates 	1980–1989
Capital 	Phnom Penh
Currency 	100 cents = 1 riel

Refer 	Cambodia

See also 	Khmer Republic

Kandia 

Refer 	Crete (Foreign Post Offices)

Karikal 

Refer 	French Indian Settlements

Karki 

Refer 	Khalki

Karolinen 

Refer 	Caroline Islands

Karpathos 

Dates 	1912–1932
Capital 	
Currency  	100 centesimi = 1 lira

Refer 	Aegean Islands (Dodecanese)

Kashmir 

Refer 	Jammu & Kashmir

Kasos 

Dates 	1912–1932
Capital 	Ayia Marina
Currency  	100 centesimi = 1 lira

Refer 	Aegean Islands (Dodecanese)

Kastellórizo 

Refer 	Castelrosso (Kastellórizo)

Katanga 

Dates 	1960–1963
Capital 	Elisabethville
Currency 	100 centimes = 1 franc

Refer 	Zaire

Kathiri State of Seiyun 

Dates 	1942–1967
Capital 	Seiyun
Currency  	(1942) 16 annas = 1 rupee
		(1951) 100 cents = 1 shilling
		(1966) 1000 fils = 1 dinar

Refer 	Aden Protectorate States

Kavalla (French Post Office) 

Dates 	1893–1914
Currency  	25 centimes = 1 piastre

Refer 	French Post Offices in the Turkish Empire

See also 	Kavalla (Greek Occupation)

Kavalla (Greek Occupation) 

Dates 	1913 only
Currency  	100 lepta = 1 drachma

Refer 	Greek Occupation Issues

Kazakhstan 

Dates 	1992 –
Capital 	Nur-Sultan
Currency 	(1992) 100 kopecks = 1 Russian ruble
		(1994) 100 tyin (ty) = 1 tenge (t)

Main article Postage stamps and postal history of Kazakhstan

See also 	Union of Soviet Socialist Republics (USSR)

Kedah 

Dates 	1912 –
Capital 	Alor Setar
Currency 	100 cents = 1 dollar

Main Article Needed 

See also 	Malaysia

Kefalonia 

Refer 	Cephalonia and Ithaca (Italian Occupation)

Kelantan 

Dates 	1911 –
Capital 	Kota Baharu
Currency 	100 cents = 1 dollar

Main Article Needed 

See also 	Malaysia

Kelantan (Japanese Occupation) 

Dates 	1942–1945
Currency 	100 cents = 1 dollar

Refer 	Japanese Occupation Issues

Kenya 

Dates 	1963 –
Capital 	Nairobi
Currency 	100 cents = 1 shilling

Main Article Needed  Postage stamps and postal history of Kenya

See also 	British East Africa;
		Kenya Uganda & Tanzania (Combined Issues)

Kenya & Uganda 

Dates 	1922–1935
Capital 	Nairobi
Currency 	100 cents = 1 shilling

Refer 	Kenya Uganda & Tanzania (Combined Issues)

Kenya Uganda & Tanganyika 

Dates 	1935–1963
Capital 	Nairobi
Currency 	100 cents = 1 shilling

Refer 	Kenya Uganda & Tanzania (Combined Issues)

Kenya Uganda Tanganyika & Zanzibar 

Dates 	1964 only
Capital 	Nairobi
Currency 	100 cents = 1 shilling

Refer 	Kenya Uganda & Tanzania (Combined Issues)

Kenya Uganda & Tanzania 

Dates 	1965–1975
Capital 	Nairobi
Currency 	100 cents = 1 shilling

Refer 	Kenya Uganda & Tanzania (Combined Issues)

Kenya Uganda & Tanzania (Combined Issues) 

Includes 	Kenya & Uganda;
		Kenya Uganda & Tanganyika;
		Kenya Uganda Tanganyika & Zanzibar;
		Kenya Uganda & Tanzania

Kerguelen 

Refer 	French Southern & Antarctic Territories

Kerrasunde (Russian Post Office) 

Dates 	1909–1910
Currency 	40 paras = 1 piastre

Refer 	Russian Post Offices in the Turkish Empire

Khalki 

Dates 	1912–1932
Capital 	
Currency  	100 centesimi = 1 lira

Refer 	Aegean Islands (Dodecanese)

Khania (Italian Post Office) 

Dates 	1900–1912
Currency  	(1900) 40 paras = 1 piastre
		(1906) 100 centesimi = 1 lira

Refer 	Italian Post Offices Abroad

See also 	Crete (Foreign Post Offices)

Khios 

Dates 	1913 only
Capital 	Khios
Currency  	100 lepta = 1 drachma (Greek)

Refer 	Greek Occupation Issues

Khmer Republic 

Dates 	1971–1975
Capital 	Phnom Penh
Currency 	100 cents = 1 riel

Refer 	Cambodia

See also 	Kampuchea

Khor Fakkan 

Refer 	Sharjah

References

Bibliography
 Stanley Gibbons Ltd, Europe and Colonies 1970, Stanley Gibbons Ltd, 1969
 Stanley Gibbons Ltd, various catalogues
 Stuart Rossiter & John Flower, The Stamp Atlas, W H Smith, 1989
 XLCR Stamp Finder and Collector's Dictionary, Thomas Cliffe Ltd, c.1960

External links
 AskPhil – Glossary of Stamp Collecting Terms
 Encyclopaedia of Postal History

Kalimnos